Andrey Rublev was the defending champion, but he chose not to participate this year.

Tommy Paul won the title, defeating Taylor Harry Fritz in an all-American final, 7–6(7–4), 2–6, 6–2.

Seeds

Main draw

Finals

Top half

Section 1

Section 2

Bottom half

Section 3

Section 4

Qualifying

Seeds

Qualifiers

Qualifying draw

First qualifier

Second qualifier

Third qualifier

Fourth qualifier

Fifth qualifier

Sixth qualifier

Seventh qualifier

Eighth qualifier

References 

Boys' Singles
2015